A Strange Guest (German: Ein seltsamer Gast) is a 1936 German drama film directed by Gerhard Lamprecht and starring Alfred Abel, Ilse Petri and Kurt Fischer-Fehling.

The film's sets were designed by the art directors Kurt Dürnhöfer and Otto Moldenhauer.

Cast
Alfred Abel as Bruneaux, art dealer  
Ilse Petri as Yvette, his daughter
Kurt Fischer-Fehling as Henry de Valencours, Yvette's fiancé  
Franz Weber as Valencour's father
Annemarie Steinsieck as Mutter de Valencours  
Fritz Odemar as Uncle Théophile  
Aribert Wäscher as Rompon  
Werner Scharf as René Morone, the blackmailer 
Elisabeth Wendt as Lou  
Eduard Wenck as hotel manager  
Eva Tinschmann as landlady  
Hermann Speelmans as Gaston, valet
Johanna Blum as Jeanette, chambermaid
Karl Falkenberg as Kellner Maurice  
Werner Stock as clerk  
Rudolf Klein-Rogge as Polizeipräfekt 
Hansjoachim Büttner as commissioner 
Bob Iller as detective #1
Hermann Meyer-Falkow as detective #2
Gerhard Dammann as Taxi driver 
Wolfram Anschütz
Valy Arnheim as the servant at Bruneaux
Johannes Bergfeldt as Gaspard, employee at Bruneaux
Werner Bernhardy as guest  
Erwin Biegel as servant  
Colette Corder as Uncle Théophile's table lady at the engagement party
Joe Münch-Harris as salesman
Edgar Nollet
Kurt Richards as secretary  
Olga Rumland as flower girl  
Maria Seidler as guest 
Ursula van Diemen 
Betty Waid as old lady at the engagement party

References

External links

Films of Nazi Germany
German drama films
1936 drama films
Films directed by Gerhard Lamprecht
UFA GmbH films
German black-and-white films
1930s German films